Alma Viktoria "Tora" Larsson (12 March 1891 – 1 September 1919) was a Swedish diver. She competed in the 1912 Summer Olympics and finished eighth in the 10 m platform event. Larsson died in the 1918 flu pandemic.

References

1891 births
1919 deaths
Swedish female divers
Olympic divers of Sweden
Divers at the 1912 Summer Olympics
Stockholms KK divers
Deaths from Spanish flu